Vince Arvidson is a Canadian cinematographer and film director from Vancouver, British Columbia. He is most noted for his work on the documentary film The Magnitude of All Things, for which he was a Canadian Screen Award nominee for Best Cinematography in a Documentary at the 10th Canadian Screen Awards in 2022.

His other cinematography credits have included the films With Child, Kayak to Klemtu and Chained.

As a filmmaker, he directed the documentary film I Forgive You, My Killer, and the short film Postage.

References

External links

Canadian cinematographers
Canadian documentary film directors
Film directors from British Columbia
Living people
Year of birth missing (living people)